Saint Laurent is a 2014 French biographical drama film co-written and directed by Bertrand Bonello, and starring Gaspard Ulliel as Yves Saint Laurent, Jérémie Renier as Pierre Bergé, and Louis Garrel as Jacques de Bascher. The supporting cast features Léa Seydoux, Amira Casar, Aymeline Valade, and Helmut Berger. The film centers on Saint Laurent's life from 1967 to 1976, during which time the famed fashion designer was at the peak of his career. The film competed for the Palme d'Or in the main competition section at the 2014 Cannes Film Festival and was released on 24 September 2014.

It was selected as the French entry for the Best Foreign Language Film at the 87th Academy Awards, but was not nominated. In January 2015, Saint Laurent received ten César Award nominations, including Best Film, Best Director, Best Actor, and Best Supporting Actor. It also received five nominations at the 20th Lumières Awards, winning Best Actor for Gaspard Ulliel.

Plot 
The film tells the story of the fashion designer Yves Saint Laurent at the peak of his career between 1967 and 1976.

Cast 
 Gaspard Ulliel as Yves Saint Laurent
 Helmut Berger as Yves Saint Laurent in 1989
 Jérémie Renier as Pierre Bergé
 Louis Garrel as Jacques de Bascher
 Léa Seydoux as Loulou de la Falaise
 Amira Casar as Anne-Marie Munoz 
 Aymeline Valade as Betty Catroux
 Valeria Bruni Tedeschi as Madame Duzer
 Micha Lescot as Monsieur Jean-Pierre
 Jasmine Trinca as Talitha Getty 
 Valérie Donzelli as Renée  
 Dominique Sanda as Lucienne

Production 
The shooting of Saint Laurent began on 30 September 2013.

Release 

The film was originally scheduled to be released on 14 May 2014. In January 2014 the studio announced the release was pushed back to 1 October 2014. The release date was later changed to 24 September 2014.

In May 2014, Sony Pictures Classics acquired the North American rights at the 2014 Cannes Film Festival, where the film premiered in competition. The film was also screened at the 52nd New York Film Festival in September 2014.

In May 2015, the film opened in four theaters in New York and Los Angeles to a $36,136 opening weekend.

Reception

Critical reception
On review aggregator website Rotten Tomatoes, the film has an approval rating of 60% based on 85 reviews, and an average rating of 5.78/10. The website's consensus reads, "A well-intentioned but frustratingly diffuse biopic, Saint Laurent proves an ironically poor fit for a look at the life of a fashion icon." On Metacritic, which assigns a normalized rating, the film has a score 52 out of 100, based on 29 critics, indicating "mixed or average reviews".

Susan Wloszczyna of RogerEbert.com gave the film 2.5 out of 4 stars, writing, "If you come away remembering anything from this 150-minute movie as it overstays its welcome, it will be individual scenes rather than the overall effect, for that is where Bonello shines." A. O. Scott of The New York Times described it as "a compulsively detailed swirl of moods and impressions, intent on capturing the contradictions of the man and his times."

Accolades

See also
 List of submissions to the 87th Academy Awards for Best Foreign Language Film
 List of French submissions for the Academy Award for Best Foreign Language Film

References

External links 
 
 

2014 films
2014 biographical drama films
2014 LGBT-related films
2014 multilingual films
2010s English-language films
2010s French films
2010s French-language films
Biographical films about LGBT people
English-language French films
EuropaCorp films
Films about fashion designers
Films about fashion in France
Films directed by Bertrand Bonello
Films featuring a Best Actor Lumières Award-winning performance
Films set in the 1960s
Films set in the 1970s
Films shot in Paris
Films with screenplays by Bertrand Bonello
Films with screenplays by Thomas Bidegain
French biographical drama films
French LGBT-related films
French multilingual films
LGBT-related drama films
Yves Saint Laurent (brand)
Cultural depictions of French men